Kaakki Sattai  is a 1985 Indian Tamil-language action film directed by Rajasekhar, starring Kamal Haasan, Ambika, Madhavi, Sathyaraj, Rajeev and Thengai Srinivasan. The film, released on 11 April 1985, became a major box office success. It was loosely remade in Hindi as Guru (1989).

Plot 
Murali is a young man who trains very hard to become a police officer. Uma is his neighbour and they fall in love with each other while Uma supports Murali to achieve his goal but he is rejected after the physical test due to not having influence or money.

Angered by the rejection, Murali turns into a local rowdy. He causes trouble in his district and comes to the attention of a notorious smuggler and murderer, Vicky and his partner Anand. After initial conflict between the two, Vicky recruits rowdy Murali into his gang. Murali becomes his most trusted member. He grows intimate with a girl, Anita, who is looking for personal revenge against Anand.

But soon Vicky's activities time and again, are foiled by the police and he finds out that they have a mole in his gang. Uma spots the changed Murali with Anita and becomes furious and breaks up with him. Then Murali reveals the truth to her. He was not rejected by the police but was recruited by a senior officer to bring down Vicky and Anand's gang. He became a rowdy to get into the gang and is acting as a mole to bring the gang down. They patch things up but Vicky finds out the truth too. In the climax, Anita kills Anand. Vicky kidnaps Uma after killing Anita and when police arrive to arrest him and blackmails Murali to help him escape. After initially helping his escape, Murali rescues Uma and Vicky is killed in the blast.

Cast 

Kamal Haasan – Murali
Madhavi – Anita
Ambika – Uma
Sathyaraj – Vicky
Rajeev – Anand
Thengai Srinivasan
Bob Christo
V. Gopalakrishnan
Kallapetti Singaram
Y. Vijaya
Senthamarai
Kanchana

Soundtrack 
The soundtrack was composed by Ilaiyaraaja. He finished composing the songs in half-a-day, well before the three-day schedule. The song "Kanmaniye Pesu" is set in Shivaranjani raga.

Reception
Jayamanmadhan of Kalki praised the performance of Haasan and Sathyaraj, stunt choreography and Ilaiyaraaja's music but felt Rajeev's character was unnecessary.

Re-release 
A digitally restored version of the film was released on 30 March 2018.

References

External links 
 

1980 films
1980s police procedural films
1980s Tamil-language films
1985 action films
1985 films
Fictional portrayals of the Tamil Nadu Police
Films directed by Rajasekhar (director)
Films scored by Ilaiyaraaja
Indian action films
Tamil films remade in other languages